The 2016 Arnold Palmer Cup was held from 24 to 26 June 2016 at Formby Golf Club in Formby, Merseyside, England.

Format
On Friday, there were five matches of foursomes in the morning, followed by five four-ball matches in the afternoon. Ten singles matches were played on Saturday, and ten more on Sunday. In all, 30 matches were played.

Each of the 30 matches was worth one point in the larger team competition. If a match was all square after the 18th hole, each side earned half a point toward their team total. The team that accumulated at least  points won the competition.

Teams
Ten college golfers from the United States and Europe participated in the event plus a non-playing head coach and assistant coach for each team.

Friday's matches

Morning foursomes

Afternoon four-ball

Saturday's singles matches

Sunday's singles matches

Michael Carter award
The Michael Carter Award winners were Robin Petersson and Charlie Danielson.

References

External links
Arnold Palmer Cup official site

Arnold Palmer Cup
Golf tournaments in England
Arnold Palmer Cup
Arnold Palmer Cup
Arnold Palmer Cup